Saint-Symphorien is a town of Wallonia and a district of the municipality of Mons, located in the province of Hainaut, Belgium.

It was a municipality until the fusion of the Belgian municipalities in 1977.

Heritage

The village's military cemetery contains about 500 German and Commonwealth graves from the First World War.

Gallery

External links
 Pictures of the Military Cemetery

Sub-municipalities of Mons
Former municipalities of Hainaut (province)